The principal gerbil (Gerbillus principulus) is a species of gerbil distributed mainly in Sudan; Jebel Meidob; El Malha. Fewer than 250 individuals of this species are thought to persist in the wild.

References

  Database entry includes a brief justification of why this species is listed as data deficient

Endemic fauna of Sudan
Gerbillus
Rodents of Africa
Mammals described in 1923
Taxa named by Oldfield Thomas
Taxa named by Martin Hinton